Very Saxy is an album by saxophonist Eddie "Lockjaw" Davis with Buddy Tate, Coleman Hawkins and Arnett Cobb recorded in 1959 for the Prestige label.

Reception
The Penguin Guide to Jazz selected the album as part of its suggested Core Collection.
The Allmusic review awarded the album 4 stars and stated: "a historic and hard-swinging jam session...  the four tenors battle it out and the results are quite exciting".

Track listing 
All compositions by Eddie "Lockjaw" Davis and George Duvivier except as indicated
 "Very Saxy" - 8:18     
 "Lester Leaps In" (Lester Young) - 6:15     
 "Fourmost" (Shirley Scott) - 5:22     
 "Foot Pattin'" (Duvivier) - 8:53     
 "Light and Lovely" - 9:55

Personnel 
 Eddie "Lockjaw" Davis - tenor saxophone 
 Buddy Tate - tenor saxophone
 Coleman Hawkins - tenor saxophone
 Arnett Cobb - tenor saxophone
 Shirley Scott - organ
 George Duvivier - bass
 Arthur Edgehill - drums

References 

Eddie "Lockjaw" Davis albums
Coleman Hawkins albums
1959 albums
Albums produced by Esmond Edwards
Albums recorded at Van Gelder Studio
Prestige Records albums